Adolph Weber (born 17 February 1875, date of death unknown) was a German gymnast. He competed in three events at the 1904 Summer Olympics.

References

1875 births
Year of death missing
German male artistic gymnasts
Olympic gymnasts of Germany
Gymnasts at the 1904 Summer Olympics
Place of birth missing